Demino is a rural locality (a village) in Kemskoye Rural Settlement, Nikolsky District, Vologda Oblast, Russia. The population was 178 as of 2002.

Geography 
Demino is located 49 km west of Nikolsk (the district's administrative centre) by road. Borok is the nearest rural locality.

References 

Rural localities in Nikolsky District, Vologda Oblast